Rush County Courthouse may refer to:

Rush County Courthouse (Indiana), Rushville, Indiana
Rush County Courthouse (Kansas), La Crosse, Kansas